Somotrichus is a genus of beetles in the family Carabidae, containing the following species:

 Somotrichus unifasciatus (Dejean, 1831)
 Somotrichus vadoni Jeannel, 1949

References

Lebiinae